Francis Ignatius de Caires (12 May 1909 – 2 February 1959) was a British Guianese cricketer who played three Test matches for West Indies in the 1930s. 

De Caires was born in British Guiana and developed into a sound right-handed batsman who made his first-class debut for British Guiana against Trinidad at Port of Spain in the 1928/29 Inter-Colonial Tournament, a match Trinidad won comfortably despite de Caires top-scoring in the visitor's first innings. 

When Marylebone Cricket Club (MCC) toured the Caribbean the following season, de Caires was selected for three of the four Test matches, including the inaugural one by the West Indies on home soil, played at Bridgetown, Barbados, in January 1930. De Caires scored 80 runs in the first innings and 70 in the second to earn his side a creditable draw. Later that year he was selected for the first tour of Australia by a West Indian Test team but did not play in any of the five Test matches.

Personal life
He was a director of the family company, De Caires Bros Ltd. His son David was a lawyer and newspaper proprietor. David's daughter Isabelle married the English Test captain Mike Atherton.

References 

 Martin-Jenkins, C. (1996) World Cricketers - A Biographical Dictionary, Oxford University Press: Oxford.
 Frindall, B. (ed.) (1995) The Wisden Book of Test Cricket, Volume 1 (1877–1977), Headline Book Publishing.
 Lawrence, B. & Goble, R. (1991) The Complete Record of West Indian Test Cricketers, ACL & Polar Publishing (UK) Ltd.

External links

1909 births
1959 deaths
West Indies Test cricketers
Guyanese cricketers
Guyana cricketers
Guyanese people of Portuguese descent